Elizabeth Benson (1888 – 1976) was a South African sculptor. Her work was part of the sculpture event in the art competition at the 1936 Summer Olympics.

References

1888 births
1976 deaths
20th-century South African sculptors
20th-century South African women artists
South African women sculptors
Olympic competitors in art competitions
People from Kimberley, Northern Cape